Miljenko may refer to:

Miljenko Grgic (born 1923), Croatian American winemaker in California
Miljenko Horvat (1935–2012), artist, architect, author and illustrator from Croatia
Miljenko Hrkać (1947–1978), Croatian terrorist sentenced to death by a Yugoslav court
Miljenko Jergović (born 1966), Bosnian Croat writer
Miljenko Kovačić (1973–2005), Croatian soccer player
Miljenko Licul (1946–2009), Slovenian graphic designer of Croatian descent
Miljenko Matijevic (born 1964), Croatian-American singer and songwriter
Miljenko Mihić (1933–2009), Bosnian Serb football coach
Miljenko Mumlek (born 1972), Croatian former footballer
Miljenko Prohaska (1925–2014), Croatian composer, music arranger and orchestral conductor
Miljenko Rak (born 1947), Croatian former long-jumper and fitness trainer
Miljenko Smoje (1923–1995), Croatian writer and journalist
Miljenko Stančić (1926–1977), Croatian painter and graphic artist

See also
Milenko
Miljko

Croatian masculine given names